William Harold Dolphin (5 November 1881 – 9 September 1969) was an Australian rules footballer who played with South Melbourne in the Victorian Football League (VFL).

Dolphin was a fullback from Yarrawonga, who captained South Melbourne in 1907 in 1908. He captained his club in the 1907 VFL Grand Final, which they lost narrowly to Carlton. An injury cost him a place in South Melbourne's 1909 premiership team, after playing in their preliminary final win the previous week. In 1911 he became just the fifth South Melbourne player to reach 100 VFL games.

References

External links

 
 

1881 births
1969 deaths
Australian rules footballers from Victoria (Australia)
Australian Rules footballers: place kick exponents
Sydney Swans players